Ballast is used in ships to provide moment to resist the lateral forces on the hull. Insufficiently ballasted boats tend to tip or heel excessively in high winds.  Too much heel may result in the vessel capsizing. If a sailing vessel needs to voyage without cargo, then ballast of little or no value will be loaded to keep the vessel upright. Some or all of this ballast will then be discarded when cargo is loaded.

Uses 

Ballast takes many forms. The simplest form of ballast used in small day sailers is so-called "live ballast", or the weight of the crew. By sitting on the windward side of the hull, the heeling moment must lift the weight of the crew. On more advanced racing boats, a wire harness called a trapeze is used to allow the crew to hang completely over the side of the hull without falling out; this provides much larger amounts of righting moment due to the larger leverage of the crew's weight, but can be dangerous if the wind suddenly dies, as the sudden loss of heeling moment can dump the crew in the water. On larger modern vessels, the keel is made of or filled with a high density material, such as concrete, iron, or lead. By placing the weight as low as possible (often in a large bulb at the bottom of the keel) the maximum righting moment can be extracted from the given mass. Traditional forms of ballast carried inside the hull were stones or sand.

High-density ballast 
There are disadvantages to using high-density ballast.  The first is the increased mass of the boat; a heavier boat sits lower in the water, increasing drag when it moves, and is generally less responsive to steering.  A heavier boat is also more difficult to put on a trailer and tow behind an automobile.  Secondly, since the ballast needs to be as low as possible, it is often placed into a centerboard or retracting keel, requiring a heavy-duty crank to lift the massive foil.  The simplest solution is to use a fixed ballasted keel, but that makes the boat nearly incapable of sailing in very shallow water, and more difficult to handle when out of the water. While prohibited by most class racing rules, some cutting-edge boats use a bulb of ballast on a long, thin keel that can tilt from side to side to create a canting keel.  This lets the ballast be placed on the windward side, providing a far greater righting moment with a lower angle of heel.  Tilting the keel, however, greatly reduces its lift, so canting keels are usually combined with a retractable centerboard or daggerboard that is deployed when the keel is tilted, and retracted (to reduce drag) when the keel is returned to the vertical. Some canting keels are designed so that when fully extended to either side they have an angle of attack of about 5° allowing the hydrofoil effect of the blade to lift the boat up and reduce wetted surface area for an increase in boat speed.

Water ballast 

A common type of ballast for small boats that avoids many of the problems of high-density ballast is water ballast.  While it seems counter-intuitive that placing water in the hull (which is, after all, close to the same density as the water outside the hullfresh vs salt water) would add any stability, adding water ballast below the vertical center of gravity increases stability. The water ballast does not need to be lifted above the waterline to affect stability, as any material having greater bulk density than air will have an effect on the centre of gravity. It is the relationship between centre of gravity and centre of buoyancy that dictates the righting moment.

The advantage of water ballast is that the tanks can be emptied, reducing draft or the weight of the boat (e.g. for transport on ground) and water added back in (in small boats, simply by opening up the valves and letting the water flow in) after the boat is launched or cargo unloaded. Pumps can also be used to empty the leeward ballast tank and fill the windward tank as the boat tacks, and the quantity of ballast can be varied to keep the boat at the optimum angle of heel. On empty cargo vessels water is added to ballast tanks to increase propeller immersion, to improve steering, and to control trim and draft.

A disadvantage of water ballast is that water is not very dense and therefore the tanks required take up more space than other forms of ballast.  Some manufacturers offer flexible ballast bags that are mounted outboard of the hull on both sides, and pumps that use the boat's speed through the water for power.  When under way, the pump can be used to fill the windward side, while the lee side is allowed to drain.  This system, while not very attractive, does allow significant gains in righting force with no modifications to the hull.

A trick commonly used on boats with water ballast is to link port and starboard tanks with a valved pipe.  When preparing to tack, the valve is opened, and water in the windward tank, which is higher, is allowed to flow to the lee side, and the sheet is let off to keep the boat from heeling too far.  Once as much water as possible has been transferred to the lee side, the boat is brought about and the sail sheeted in, lifting the newly full windward tank.  A simple hand pump can then be used to move any remaining water from the lee to the windward tank.

Environmental impacts and regulations 

Cruise ships, large tankers, and bulk cargo carriers use a tremendous amount of ballast water, which is often taken on in the coastal waters in one region after ships discharge wastewater or unload cargo, and discharged at the next port of call, wherever more cargo is loaded. Ballast water discharge typically contains a variety of biological materials, including plants, animals, viruses, and other microorganisms. These materials often include non-native, nuisance, exotic species that can cause extensive ecological and economic damage to aquatic ecosystems. Ballast water discharges are believed to be the leading source of invasive species in U.S. marine waters, thus posing public health and environmental risks, as well as significant economic cost to industries such as water and power utilities, commercial and recreational fisheries, agriculture, and tourism. A recent study suggests that if no action is taken on ballast water management, species invasion can propagate to any port in the world via global shipping network with an average of two intermediate stops.

Meanwhile, studies suggest that the economic cost just from introduction of pest mollusks (zebra mussels, the Asian clam, and others) to U.S. aquatic ecosystems is more than $6 billion per year.

In case of a bulk cargo ship, there is another environmental effect of ballast water. After unloading the payload a bulk carrier cannot simply return to the starting point, but it must load ballast to get the propeller submerged below water surface. The weight of the ballast increases fuel consumption compared to a hypothetical situation that the ship did not need ballast.

A June 2011 National Research Council (United States) study provided advice on the process of setting regulatory limits. The study found that determining the exact number of organisms that could be expected to launch a new population is complex. It suggested an initial step of establishing a benchmark for the concentrations of organisms in ballast water below current levels, and then using models to analyze experimental and field-based data to help inform future decisions about ballast water discharge standards.

To minimize the spread of invasive species in U.S. waterways, the Environmental Protection Agency and the U.S. Coast Guard regulate the concentration of living organisms discharged in the ballast water of ships.

See also 
 Ballast
 Environmental issues with shipping

References 

This article incorporates text from a public domain Congressional Research Service report: Copeland, Claudia. "Cruise Ship Pollution: Background, Laws and Regulations, and Key Issues" (Order Code RL32450). Congressional Research Service (Updated February 6, 2008).

External links 

Globallast partnership (IMO)
Profile - Ballast Water, National Invasive Species Information Center, United States National Agricultural Library. Lists general information and resources for ballast water.

Sailing